The following is a list of heads of the Chicago Police Department.

Currently the executive of the Chicago Police Department is referred to as a "Superintendent of Police". Preceding titles included High Constable, City Marshall, General Superintendent of Police, and Commissioner of Police.

The current head, holding the position of "Superintendent of Police", is David Brown, appointed by mayor Lori Lightfoot.

History
The original head of police position, existent from 1835 through 1842, was referred to as "High Constable". The position was an elected one.

The second title used for the head of police was "City Marshall", which was used from 1842 through 1861. The position was an elected one. For a single year during (1855-56) this time, Chicago briefly had an appointed Chief of Police position that co-headed the department alongside the City Marshall.

The title used for the head of police from 1861 to 1927 was "General Superintendent of Police". The position was an appointed one. After the Board of Police Commissioners was legislated out of existence in 1875, the office of City Marshall was brought back to jointly serve as the head of the Chicago Police Department alongside the General Superintendent of Police. This time, the office was an appointed one. By vote of the City Council on May 31, 1876 the office of City Marshall was to be abolished. The office was consequentially eliminated June 5, 1876, with the position of General Superintendent of Police reinstated as the sole head of police. From this point on, the city has had only a singular head of police at a time. 

From 1927 through 1960, the head of police was titled the Commissioner of Police.

In 1960, the head of police assumed its current title, Superintendent of Police.

Samuel Nolan was the first African-American individual to serve as head of the police department in an interim capacity, doing so from late–1979 until January 1980. Fred Rice Jr., who served as superintendent from 1983 through 1987, was the African-American individual to serve on a permanent basis.

Recent
On November 8, 2019, Mayor Lori Lightfoot appointed retired Los Angeles police chief Charlie Beck as the city's interim superintendent. Mayor Rahm Emanuel had appointed former Bureau of Patrol Chief Eddie T. Johnson as Superintendent on March 28, 2016; on December 2, 2019, Mayor Lightfoot terminated Johnson's superintendent contract for cause. He was preceded by Garry F. McCarthy, former director of the Newark, New Jersey, Police Department, as superintendent; this was approved by the city council on June 8, 2011. McCarthy was the highest paid city employee with an annual salary of $260,004. McCarthy was fired by Mayor Rahm Emanuel on December 1, 2015, after refusing Emanuel's request that he resign over the city's high murder rate and his department's handling of the murder of Laquan McDonald.

Prior to McCarthy's appointment, Jody P. Weis had served as superintendent of police since February 2008. At the time, Weis was the second Chicago police superintendent hired from outside of the city. He replaced Philip J. Cline, who officially retired on August 3, 2007. Weis' contract expired on March 1, 2011. Mayor Richard M. Daley appointed Cline's predecessor, Terry Hillard, on an interim basis.

List of heads of the Chicago Police Department

Notes
 Orsemus Morrison's tenure predates the incorporation of Chicago as a city. While no mayor was serving at the time he was High Constable, John H. Kinzie was Town President

 The position of "General Superintendent of Police" ceased to be the head of the Chicago Police Department prior to the end of O'Connor's tenure, which was December 29, 1964

See also
List of heads of the Chicago Fire Department

References